Ernst Kovács (born 11 November 1884, date of death unknown) was an Austrian water polo player. He competed in the men's tournament at the 1912 Summer Olympics.

References

1884 births
Year of death missing
Austrian male water polo players
Olympic water polo players of Austria
Water polo players at the 1912 Summer Olympics
Sportspeople from the Austro-Hungarian Empire